Udalguri district (Pron:ˌʊdʌlˈgʊəri), also known as Odalguri, is a district in the Bodoland Territorial Region of the state of Assam in Northeastern India. Udalguri town is the headquarters of the district.

Etymology
The name Udalguri, denotes a place surrounding the Udal tree (Udal, meaning a tree and Guri meaning surrounding area). Some authors are of the opinion that the name of the place became Udalguri as there was a hermitage of a sage named Uddalak Muni. Yet, another source mentions that the word has origins in the Boro language. Bodo people still pronounce the name as Odalguri. In Bodo language  means wide and spacious and  means powdered object.

History
This district was formed on June 14, 2004 as one of the four districts under the Bodoland Territorial Council. This district was carved out by bifurcating Darrang district. The territory of the present district was earlier Udalguri sub-division of the undivided district.  There are Hindu, Christians and Muslim population living together in the district.  This was a very peaceful place till mid 80s but various communal clashes took place from time to time.  Late Jojaram Sharma was one of the prominent India freedom fighters from Assam lived here.

Tourism
Other than the multitude of culture and tradition of the various ethnic communities, the district has several tourist places. Some of the important ones are,

 Part of Orang National Park
 Bathou temple and Research centre in Odalguri District (All Bathou Mahasabha)
 Old Namghar (Assamese Worship Place) in Udalguri Town
 Tea gardens at Kachubil
 Old Hanuman temple in Udalguri Town
 Old Baptist Christian church in Udalguri Town
 Bhairabkunda Picnic Spot
 Gethsemane Man-made Forest (Bhairabkunda)

Demographics
According to the 2011 census Udalguri district's population is 8,31,668, an increase of 9.8% over 2001. The literacy rate is 66.6% and the gender ratio is 966. Scheduled Castes and Scheduled Tribes make up 4.55% and 32.15% of the population respectively.

The district is multi-ethnic and multi-religious in nature. Bodos forms the largest ethnic group in the district with 33.76% of the district's population. Other ethnic groups with significant population are Adivasi community with almost 23.12% and Bengali Muslims with 12% of the district's population. Assamese and Bengali Hindus resides mainly in urban areas. There is also a presence of sizeable Nepali  speaking Gorkha community with estimated 5% of the district's population thinly scattered across the Udalguri district.

Religion 

Hindus are the largest group in the district, making up 612,425 which is 73.64% of the population. There are also 110,215 Christians (13.25%) and 108,319 Muslims (12.66%) in the district.

Languages 

According to the 2011 census, 26.90% of the population speaks Boro, 22.62% Assamese, 19.43% Bengali, 7.88% Sadri, 5.6% Nepali, 2.79% Santali, 2.64% Odia, 2.08% Kurukh, 1.66% Hindi, 1.57% Mundari and 1.45% Bhojpuri as their first language.

Geography
This district is bounded by Bhutan and West Kameng district of Arunachal Pradesh state in the north, Sonitpur district in the east, Darrang district in the south and Tamulpur district in the west. Area of the district is 1852.16 km2.

Major Towns
Odalguri is the largest town in Udalguri district. Other towns include Tangla, Rowta, Mazbat, Kalaigaon,  Paneri, Khairabari and Bhergaon.

Wildlife Sanctuary
Bornadi Wildlife Sanctuary (Part)

Flora and fauna
It shares the park with four other districts.

Animals like elephants, Hog Deer, Tiger, Wild Boar, Civet, etc. are found. Birds like Bengal Florican, Black-necked Stork, Greater Adjudant Stork, Pallas's Fishing Eagle and Reptiles such as King Cobra, Python, Paradise Flying Snake, Lessemys Punctate, etc. can also be found.

Administration

Divisions
The district has two sub-divisions: Udalguri and Bhergaon. These two sub-divisions are further divided into 5 revenue circles: Udalguri, Majbat, Harisinga, Kalaigaon, Khoirabari.

Three Vidhan Sabha constituencies of this district are Paneri, Majbat, and Udalguri. All of these are part of Mangaldoi Lok Sabha constituency.

Apart from these three Legislative Assembly constituencies, majority of the villages under Kalaigaon Legislative Assembly Constituency and a few villages fall under the Borsola Legislative Assembly Constituency fall in Udalguri District. While Kalaigaon LAC is a part of Mangaldai Lok Sabha Constituency and Borsola LAC is a part of Tezpur Lok Sabha Constituency.

Dhansiri Irrigation Project, the largest irrigation project in the region is situated in Udalguri.

References

External links
 Udalguri district website

 
Districts of Assam
States and territories established in 2004
2004 establishments in Assam
Bodoland